Defector is the second solo album by Widespread Panic keyboardist John Hermann, released in 2003.

Track listing
All tracks written by John Hermann except where noted.

"Mrs. Brown" 3:39
"I'll Get Around to It" 3:50
"Smoking Factory" 2:43
"And You Wonder Why" 4:02
"Step on Over Me" 3:32
"The True Blood Assembly of Ravensville" 3:44
"Annie Stay" 2:09
"When It's My Time" 4:30
"Aim to Speed" 2:53
"Gonna Get a Ride" 4:03
"Let It All Go" (David Andrews) 3:40

Personnel

Musicians
John Hermann – guitar, keyboards, vocals
George McConnell – guitar
Luther Dickinson – guitar
Cody Dickinson – drums
Kenny Brown – guitar
Bruce Watson – guitar
Cedric Burnside – drums
Paul Edwards – bass
Glen Duncan – mandolin, violin

Production
John Hermann – producer
John Keane – mixing
Mark Yoshida – mastering
Rusty McFarland – engineer, mixing
Ben Strano – engineer, mixing
Dustin Mitchell – engineer
Joey Turner – engineer
Bruce Watson – engineer
Derek Hess – cover art
Brandon "Wundabred" Seavers – layout design

References

External links
Defector on AllMusic

2003 albums
Fat Possum Records albums